Parlamentet is a satirical panel gameshow on TV4, which parodies Swedish political debate. It was first broadcast in 1999 and is currently in its 23rd series. The current presenter is Anders S. Nilsson, who has hosted the show since 2004. Current team members include Babben Larsson, Robin Paulsson, Johan Rheborg and Johan Glans. Kodjo Akolor has also been featured.
The program is a Swedish version of the short-run British show If I Ruled the World.   The comedians are divided into two teams (parties), red and blue, representing traditional political colours.

History
The show has had many producers over the years including Anders S. Nilsson, Gustaf Skördeman, Stefan Wiik and currently Benjamin Thuresson.
The original 1999 panel consisted of Helge Skoog and Johan Wahlström in the blue party with Lasse Eriksson and Annika Lantz in the red party.

Parlamentet was awarded the Kristallen award for best comedy in 2005 and Swedish tabloid newspaper Aftonbladet's TV prize for "Swedish program of the year" (2001–2004), "Entertainment program of the year" (2002–2004) and "Best comedy" (2005, 2007)

Rounds

Teams

See also
If I Ruled the World

References

External links
 
 

TV4 (Sweden) original programming
Swedish satirical television shows
Swedish comedy television series
1999 Swedish television series debuts
2006 Swedish television series endings
Swedish political satire